Hotel California is a 2008 film that follows three professional criminals in Los Angeles.

Plot
The film follows Troy (Erik Palladino) as he returns to Los Angeles from Miami to meet with his former partners: Al (Tyson Beckford) and Pete (Simon Rex), whom Troy betrayed years before.  Naturally they are dismayed to see him and call their boss, infamous crime syndicate leader Dmitri (Raymond J. Barry) to inform them that Troy has returned.  The three of them, along with Troy's former love Jessie (Tatyana Ali) attempt to exact their revenge, while Troy tries to convince them that he is not the man he was before.  He also has a brand new and devious plan for his former partners to get involved in.

Cast
Erik Palladino as Troy
Tyson Beckford as Al
Simon Rex as Pete
Tatyana Ali as Jessie
Raymond J. Barry as Dmitri Debartolla
Yancey Arias as Hector Ramos
Noel Gugliemi as Chino
Gabriel Womack as Jodie (The Rapist)
John P. McGarr as Body Guard
Steve Black as Antonio

Production
It was produced by Alliance Group Entertainment. The movie was filmed throughout Los Angeles in early 2007 and is directed by first time director Geo Santini. During filming in Los Angeles, the LAPD mistook the actors' prop weapons for actual weapons, and placed actor Erik Palladino and members of the crew in handcuffs until the producers were able to resolve the situation.

Release
The film premiered on 25 July 2008 as part of the New York International Latino Film Festival presented by HBO and was part of the Boston Film Festival on 13 September 2008. Hotel California was an Official Selection on 16 September 2008 of the Los Angeles Latino International Film Festival and the Kansas International Film Festival on 21 September 2008. The official theatrical release was on 23 March 2010 in the United States.

References

External links
Hotel California Official Film Trailer
Hotel California at the Internet Movie Database
Hotel California on MySpace

2008 films
2008 directorial debut films
American crime drama films
2008 action thriller films
Films set in Los Angeles
American crime thriller films
American action thriller films
2000s English-language films
2000s American films